Alami (also spelled el-Alami, al-Alami, El Alami, Elalamy) is a surname. Notable people with the surname include:

Abd al-Salam ibn Mashish al-Alami (died 1227), Moroccan Sufi saint
Abu Bakr al-Alami al-Idrissi (died 10th-century AD), Moroccan religious leader
Lalla Aicha bint Ali ibn Rashid al-Alami (1485 – 14 July 1561), Governor of Tétouan between 1515–1542 and a Moroccan privateer
Ali ibn Rashid al-Alami, was the founder of the city of Chefchaouen, Morocco
Amal ibn Idris al-Alami (born 1950), Moroccan physician, neurosurgeon and writer
Faidi al-Alami, Mayor of Jerusalem from 1906 to 1909
Moulay Hafid Elalamy (born 1960), Moroccan businessman and politician
Idriss ibn al-Hassan al-Alami (1925–2007), Moroccan poet and translator
Karim Alami (born 1973), Moroccan tennis player
Laila Lalami (born 1968), Moroccan-American novelist, essayist, and professor
Lamis al-Alami (born 1943), Palestinian educator and politician
Mohammed al-Harraq al-Alami (1772–1845), Moroccan poet and Islamic religious leader
Mohammed ibn Mohammed Alami (1932–1993), Moroccan poet
Musa Alami (1897–1984), Palestinian nationalist and politician
Qaddur al-Alami (1742–1850), Moroccan songwriter and  poet
Saad al-Alami (1911–1993), Palestinian Sunni Muslims and the fourth Grand Mufti of Jerusalem
Salima El Ouali Alami (born 1983), Moroccan athlete
Samar Alami, Lebanese-Palestinian chemical engineers and imprisoned on charges of terrorism
Saifeddine Alami (born 1992), Moroccan footballer
Solomon Alami, Portuguese-Jewish ethical writer of the 14th and 15th centuries

See also 
El Alami Group, Companie of Morocco
Khatib and Alami, planning, architectural and engineering consulting company

Surnames of Moroccan origin